Fort Frayne is a 1926 American silent Western film directed by Ben F. Wilson and starring Wilson, Neva Gerber,  Ruth Royce, and Lafe McKee. It is based on the 1901 novel of the same name by Charles King. It is now considered to be a lost film.

Plot
As described in a film magazine reviews, Captain Malcolm Teale loves Helen Farrar, daughter of Colonel John Farrar. The Colonel, fatally wounded in an Indian fight, tells Teale that his son Royle, believed dead, is actually alive and a fugitive from justice. Following the death of the Colonel, his wife takes as a companion the woman who is the son's wife. The fugitive son joins the Army and meets his wife when he is assigned to the post. A series of coincidences entangle Teale, the son, and the son's wife, resulting in Teale and Helen becoming estranged. However, after some explanations, the difficulties are resolved.

Cast
 Ben F. Wilson as Capt. Malcolm Teale
 Neva Gerber as Helen Farrar
 Ruth Royce as Mrs. Daunton
 Bill Patton as Royle Farrar / Graice
 Lafe McKee as Col. John Farrar

References

Bibliography
 Connelly, Robert B. The Silents: Silent Feature Films, 1910-36, Volume 40, Issue 2. December Press, 1998.
 Munden, Kenneth White. The American Film Institute Catalog of Motion Pictures Produced in the United States, Part 1. University of California Press, 1997.

External links
 

1926 films
1926 Western (genre) films
1920s English-language films
American silent feature films
Silent American Western (genre) films
American black-and-white films
Films directed by Ben F. Wilson
1920s American films